Reinhard von Schorlemer (born April 27 1938 in Fürstenau)  is a farmer, landowner and German politician for Christian Democratic Union of Germany.

Life 
His parents were Timo Clemens Freiherr von Schorlemer (1903–1962) and Alice Elisabeth Gräfin von Merveldt Freiin zu Lembeck. 
Since 1955 Schorlemer has been a member of the Christian Democratic Union of Germany political party. A farmer on his own land in Schlichthorst, Lower Saxony since 1965, from 1974 to 1980 Schorlemer was a member of the Landtag of Lower Saxony and was a member of the German Bundestag from 1980 to 2002. He is member of the Deutsche Parlamentarische Gesellschaft (German Parliamentary Association) and the Waldbauernverband Weser/Ems. From 1992 to 2000 he was president of organisation Arbeitsgemeinschaft Deutscher Waldbesitzerverbände seit 1948. Schorlemer is married with Monika Gatzen (born 1945) and has five children.

Awards 
 Order of Merit of the Federal Republic of Germany

References

External links 

 Bundestag: Reinhard von Schorlemer
 NOZ.de: Reinhard von Schorlemer Ehrenmitglied im Forstwirtschaftsrat

Members of the Bundestag for the Christian Democratic Union of Germany
Members of the Bundestag 1998–2002
Members of the Bundestag 1994–1998
Members of the Bundestag 1990–1994
Members of the Bundestag 1987–1990
Members of the Bundestag 1983–1987
Members of the Bundestag 1980–1983
Members of the Landtag of Lower Saxony
Members of the Bundestag for Lower Saxony
20th-century German politicians
21st-century German politicians
Officers Crosses of the Order of Merit of the Federal Republic of Germany
German landowners
German farmers
German foresters
1938 births
Living people